André Chilo (5 July 1898 – 3 November 1982) was a French rugby union player and athlete who competed in the 1920 Summer Olympics. He was born in Bordeaux and died in Barcus.

In 1920 he won the silver medal as member of the French rugby team. He also participated in the triple jump competition and finished 17th.

References

External links
profile

1898 births
1982 deaths
Sportspeople from Bordeaux
French rugby union players
French male triple jumpers
Olympic rugby union players of France
Olympic athletes of France
Rugby union players at the 1920 Summer Olympics
Athletes (track and field) at the 1920 Summer Olympics
Olympic silver medalists for France
France international rugby union players
Medalists at the 1920 Summer Olympics